Nachingwea is a town in southern Tanzania. It was the terminus of a railway built for the infamous, ill-fated Tanganyika groundnut scheme. The town is also the site of the tomb of Judy the Dog—the first dog to be given prisoner of war status and recipient of the Dickin Medal. The memorial was put in place by her companion through the war, Frank Williams, who lived in Nachingwea for some time.

Climate

References 

Populated places in Lindi Region